Major General Aubrey Ellis Williams  (19 May 1888 – 25 March 1977) was a senior British Army officer who served in both the First World War and Second World War.

Military career
The son of a British Army officer, Lieutenant Colonel D. E. Williams, Aubrey Williams was born on 19 May 1888 and was educated at Monmouth School for Boys. He later entered the Royal Military College, Sandhurst, from where he was commissioned as a second lieutenant into the South Wales Borderers on 9 October 1907. He was promoted to lieutenant on 9 June 1909.

Williams fought in the First World War and received a promotion to the rank of captain on 22 October 1914. After seeing action in the Gallipoli campaign, and after being awarded the Military Cross (MC) in 1916, he served as a staff officer with the 30th Division on the Western Front, earning recognition with his appointment as a Companion of the Distinguished Service Order (DSO). The citation for his DSO reads:

He was wounded twice and was also mentioned in despatches five times during the First World War.

Williams also saw action during the Waziristan campaign in late 1937 earning him a bar to his DSO in August 1938.

He became commander of the 160th Infantry Brigade, part of the 53rd (Welsh) Infantry Division, in February 1939 and, in April 1940, seven months after the outbreak of the Second World War, went with his brigade to Northern Ireland where the brigade was mainly involved in anti-invasion duties and exercises training to repel a potential German invasion of Northern Ireland. He became General Officer Commanding (GOC) of the 38th (Welsh) Division in the United Kingdom in May 1940 before retiring from the army in October.

In retirement he was local President of the Royal British Legion on the Isle of Wight.

References

Bibliography

External links
Generals of World War II

1888 births
1977 deaths
British Army major generals
British Army generals of World War II
British Army personnel of World War I
Commanders of the Order of the British Empire
Companions of the Distinguished Service Order
Graduates of the Royal Military College, Sandhurst
Graduates of the Staff College, Quetta
People educated at Monmouth School for Boys
Recipients of the Military Cross
South Wales Borderers officers